Hamiota perovalis, the orangenacre mucket or orange-nacre mucket, is a species of freshwater mussel, an aquatic bivalve mollusk in the family Unionidae, the river mussels.

This species is endemic to Alabama and Mississippi in the United States.

Description
This mussel is 5 to 9 centimeters long. It is yellow to reddish brown in color, and has a pink or white nacre.

This bivalve has an appendage that resembles a fish, which it uses to lure host fish for its parasitic larva (glochidia).

References

External links
 USFWS. Lampsilis perovalis Species Report.

Endemic fauna of Alabama
Endemic fauna of Mississippi
Unionidae
Bivalves described in 1834
Taxa named by Timothy Abbott Conrad
ESA threatened species

Taxonomy articles created by Polbot